Aditya Birla Fashion and Retail Limited (ABFRL) is an Indian fashion retail company headquartered in Mumbai. ABFRL has a network of 3468+ stores with a presence across 25,000 multi-brand outlets(approx.) with 6,500+ point of sales in department stores across India. ABFRL was previously known as Pantaloons Fashion & Retail Limited prior to its acquisition by the Aditya Birla Group.

History

Madura Garments was established in 1988, acquired by the Aditya Birla Group in 1999 and was re-christened Madura Fashion & Lifestyle in 2010. MFL brands includes Louis Philippe, Allen Solly, Van Heusen and Peter England.

In 2013, Aditya Birla Nuvo Limited (ABNL) took over Pantaloons. In May 2015, ABFRL came into form after the consolidation of the apparel businesses of the Aditya Birla Group, consisting of ABNL's Madura Fashion division and ABNL's subsidiaries- Pantaloons Fashion and Retail Ltd (PFRL  acquired in 2013) and Madura Fashion & Lifestyle (MFL established in 1988) in May 2015. Post the consolidation, PFRL was renamed Aditya Birla Fashion and Retail Ltd. (ABFRL).

The Collective, India's first and largest multi-retail brand for international brands, was launched in 2008.
In 2016, ABFRL struck a deal with a global luxury brand Ted Baker and also signed a MOU With Forever 21 for India Business.

In 2017, ABFRL brought Simon Carter to India. In the same year, ABFRL entered into a strategic alliance with American Eagle.

In 2018, ABFRL entered into a Store License and Distribution Agreement with Ralph Lauren Asia Pacific Limited (“RLAPL”), which offers apparel and accessories for both men and women under the brand name "Polo Ralph Lauren" and Ralph Lauren.

In 2019, ABFRL acquired ethnic wear brands, Jaypore and TG Apparel & Décor, for an enterprise value of up to  ₹110 Crore. In the same year, the company bought 51% stake in M/s Finesse International Design Private Limited (“Finesse”) under the brand name Shantanu & Nikhil.

In 2019, ABFRL launched a chain of large format value fashion stores, named Style Up. Style Up typically operates large format stores, sized between 6,000 and 8,000 sq. ft, selling ethnic and western apparel and accessories for men, women and children.

In 2021, ABFRL announced a strategic partnership with India's largest design brand 'Sabyasachi' by signing a definitive agreement for acquiring 51% stake in 'Sabyasachi' brand. This partnership will add significant weight to ABFRL's growing ethnic wear portfolio, and the platform will complement the brand on its journey to becoming a global luxury house out of India.

In 2021, ABFRL acquired a 34% stake in Tarun Tahiliani's luxury business with an option to increase this shareholding to 51 percent in the next few years. ABFRL also entered into partnership with Tahiliani to form a new entity that will develop and launch affordable premium ethnic wear and accessories. ABFRL will hold an 80 percent stake in this new brand. Tasva is owned by Indivinity Clothing that is product of a 2021 partnership between Tahiliani, and Aditya Birla Fashion & Retail Ltd. Tasva was launched in December 2021 and caters to the premium occasion-wear segment and offers men’s wear at accessible price points.

In June 2021, Jaypore, part of Aditya Birla Fashion and Retail Limited, entered into menswear category.

ABFRL received permission to launch Reebok stores in India in 2022.

In January 2022, ABFRL has acquired 51% stake at Masaba Gupta's brand House of Masaba Lifestyle for 90 crore.

The company declared in January 2023 that Ananya Birla and Aryaman Vikram Birla had been appointed as directors to the company's board.

Data Breach 
In December 2021, Indian retailer Aditya Birla Fashion and Retail were breached and ransomed by ShinyHunters. The ransom demand was allegedly rejected and data containing 5.4M unique email addresses were subsequently dumped publicly on a popular hacking forum the next month. The data contained extensive personal customer information including names, phone numbers, physical addresses, DoBs, order histories and passwords stored as MD5 hashes. Hacker claimed Aditya Birla Fashion's websites are still vulnerable while company says 'Access Secured'.

Store 
As on 31 March 2020, ABFRL has a network of 3468 brand stores across the country. It is present across 25,000 multi-brand outlets and 6,514 SIS across departmental stores across India.

Operations 
ABFRL portfolio includes several brands such as Louis Philippe, Van Heusen, Allen Solly and Peter England established for over 25 years. Pantaloons brands caters to men, women and children with a mix of private labels and licensed brands in apparel and accessories.

ABFRL holds online and offline rights to the India network of California-based fashion brand Forever 21. Its International Brands portfolio includes The Collective and select mono-brands such as Simon Carter, Hackett London, Ted Baker, Ralph Lauren, American Eagle, and Fred Perry.

References

External links 

Clothing retailers of India
Aditya Birla Group
Indian companies established in 1997
1997 establishments in Maharashtra
Retail companies established in 1997
Companies listed on the National Stock Exchange of India
Companies listed on the Bombay Stock Exchange